The 2015 Youngstown State Penguins football team represented Youngstown State University in the 2015 NCAA Division I FCS football season. They were led by first-year head coach Bo Pelini and played their home games at Stambaugh Stadium. They were a member of the Missouri Valley Football Conference. They finished the season 5–6, 3–5 in MVFC play to finish in a three-way tie for sixth place.

Schedule

Source: Schedule

Ranking movements

References

Youngstown State
Youngstown State Penguins football seasons
Youngstown State Penguins football